"Unison" is a song written by Bruce Roberts and Andy Goldmark, and first recorded by the English singer Junior in 1983 for the Tom Cruise-starred movie All the Right Moves. A minor hit, the song would attract a good deal of attention in 1990, when three female singers each covered the song and placed it on their respective albums of that year.

Laura Branigan recorded the song for her sixth, self-titled album. Expatriate American singer Lory Bianco recorded the song for her album Lonely Is the Night. The song's greatest success, however, would come when it was chosen to be the title track of Celine Dion's English debut album.

Celine Dion version

Canadian singer Celine Dion covered "Unison" for her first English-language album of the same name (1990). The song was released by Columbia Records as the album's second single in Canada on 9 July 1990. The next year, it was issued as the fourth single in Japan. Dion's version was produced by Goldmark.

After its release, "Unison" received positive reviews from music critics. It was nominated for the Juno Award for Dance Recording of the Year. The song peaked at number 38 in Canada and became a success on the Canadian Dance Chart topping it for seven weeks. The accompanying music video for the song was directed by Robin Miller.

Background and release
In 1989, Dion recorded "Can't Live with You, Can't Live Without You," a duet with Billy Newton-Davis included on his album, Spellbound. The track was produced by Andy Goldmark. At the same time, Dion was recording her first English-language album, Unison. Goldmark produced the title track, which was released as the second single in Canada on 9 July 1990. It was also issued as the fourth single in Japan on 4 November 1991. In the rest of the world, "Unison" was used as B-side to "The Last to Know" single.

For the single release, "Unison" was remixed by Kevin Unger. He created four remixes: Single Mix with Rap, Single Mix without Rap, Mainstream/Extended Mix and Club Mix. Three of them feature rap by Frankie Fudge. Ruth Pointer can be heard on the background vocals. The remixes took weeks of pre-production with the ultimate goal of making the original album version into a dance pop track for both contemporary radios and club dance floors. The new versions took three days to mix at Toronto's famed Metal Works Studios.

Critical reception
Chicago Tribune Jan De Knock wrote: "Dion's big voice invites comparisons to the power-pop stylings of Taylor Dayne and Laura Branigan (coincidentally, the disco-flavored title track "Unison" also appears on Branigan's latest LP.)"

Commercial performance
In Canada, "Unison" debuted on the charts in July 1990 and peaked at number 38 on The Record Retail Singles Chart on 17 September 1990. It also peaked at number seven on the RPM Adult Contemporary Chart.

Music video
The music video for "Unison" was made for the Single Mix with rap by Frankie Fudge and released in July 1990. It was directed by Robin Miller. The person who appears in the video rapping, is not Fudge. The music video was later included on the Unison VHS.

Live performances
Dion performed "Unison" on a few Canadian television shows in 1990. She also sang it during her Unison Tour, Celine Dion in Concert, The Colour of My Love Tour, and also in the closing concert dubbed "Millenium Concert" of her Let's Talk About Love World Tour. It was also performed as part of a medley with contestants of Star Académie in 2009.  It was also a part of a medley in her 2018 tour and the final year of her Las Vegas residency show, Celine.

Awards and accolades
At the Juno Awards of 1991, "Unison" (Mainstream/Extended Mix) was nominated for the Juno Award for Dance Recording of the Year but lost to "Don't Wanna Fall in Love" (Knife Feel Good Mix) by Jane Child. It was also voted the song of 1990 in Quebec (ahead of Madonna's "Vogue") on the NRJ radio network's Le choix du Québec. Arguably, the success of the remix was the springboard Sony Music Canada needed to garner the attention of its US parent company, leading to Dion's release in the US market.

Track listings and formats

Canadian 7" single
"Unison" (Single Mix) – 4:03
"Unison" (Single Mix without Rap) – 4:03

Canadian cassette single
"Unison" (Single Mix) – 4:03
"Unison" (Single Mix without Rap) – 4:03
"Unison" (Mainstream / Extended Mix) – 7:15

Canadian 12" single
"Unison" (Mainstream / Extended Mix) – 7:15
"Unison" (Club Mix) – 7:26

Japanese CD single
"Unison" (Single Mix) – 4:03
"Délivre-moi" – 3:52
"Can't Live with You, Can't Live Without You" – 4:16
"Unison" (Album Version) – 4:12

Charts

Weekly charts

Year-end charts

Credits and personnel
Recording
Recorded at Studio 55, John Barnes Studio, Steve Mitchell's, Los Angeles and Skyline Midi Studio, Unique Recording Studios, New York

Personnel

Celine Dion – lead vocals
Andy Goldmark – songwriter, producer, arranger, drum programming, bass synth, keyboards
Bruce Roberts – songwriter
Paul Pesco – guitars
Charles Fearing – guitars
John Barnes – keyboards
"Ready" Freddy Washington – electric bass
Fonzi Thornton – background vocals
Biti "Beat Box" Strauchn – mouth percussion
Fran Manzella – additional programming
Dave Dachinger – additional programming, engineer
Mike Brooks – engineer
Jack Rouben – engineer
Bob Rosa – mix
Norene Rill – production coordination
Kevin Unger – additional producer (Remix only)
Frankie Fudge – rap (Remix only)
Ruth Pointer – background vocals (Remix only)

Release history

References

External links

1983 songs
1990 singles
Casablanca Records singles
Celine Dion songs
Columbia Records singles
Epic Records singles
Laura Branigan songs
Songs written by Andy Goldmark
Songs written by Bruce Roberts (singer)